South East (Fujian) Motor Co., Ltd., trading as Soueast, is a Chinese automobile manufacturer based in Fuzhou, Fujian, and a joint venture between China Motor Corporation (25%), Fujian Motor Industry Group (50%) and Mitsubishi Motors (25%). Its principal activity is the design, development, production and sale of passenger cars and minibuses sold under the Soueast marque. It also manufactures Mitsubishi brand passenger cars for sale in mainland China.

As of early 2011, Soueast had an annual production capacity of around 180,000 units, but this was set to rise to 300,000 with the completion of current construction, which may have been finished by early 2012.

History
Soueast was founded in November 1995 as a joint venture between China Motor Corporation and Fujian Motor Industry Group. Mitsubishi became a partner in the joint venture in 2006.

In April 2008, Soueast was awarded a contract to supply 5,700 Delica minibuses to the Iranian Mehreghan Co. In the same year, Jackie Chan was signed on as a Mitsubishi brand ambassador for Mainland China markets.

Products
Soueast Motors produces Soueast-branded models including the V3 and V5 sedans, and a range of Mitsubishi models for the Chinese market.

Soueast marque
Soueast produces the following models under the Soueast marque:

Soueast A5 Yiwu (2019)
Soueast DX3 (2016)
Soueast DX5 (2019)
Soueast DX7 Bolang SUV (2015)
Soueast DX9

Discontinued:
Soueast C1 Xiwang microvan (2011)
Soueast Delica minibus (1996)
Soueast Freeca (2001)
Soueast Lioncel (2003)
Soueast V3 Lingyue sedan (2008)
Soueast V5 Lingzhi sedan (2012)
Soueast V6 Lingshi hatchback (2013)

Mitsubishi marque
Soueast produces the following models under the Mitsubishi marque:
Lancer
Lancer EX
Lancer Fortis
Galant
Zinger

Dodge marque
Dodge Caravan

Operations
Soueast has at least one production base in Qingkou city, Minhou County, Fuzhou, Fujian province. This location has probably been expanded three times with the second phase possibly completed  as that year saw a 150% increase in units produced. As of early 2011, total yearly production capacity for all sites was forecast to soon reach 300,000 with the completion of the base's third phase.  February 2012 production was 37% higher than that of the previous year, which may reflect this additional capacity coming online.

Sales
A total of 96,553 Soueast brand passenger cars were sold in China in 2013, making it the 38th largest-selling car brand in the country in that year (and the 21st largest-selling Chinese brand).

Notes

References

External links
Official website 
Official website 

Car manufacturers of China
Electric vehicle manufacturers of China
Vehicle manufacturing companies established in 1995
Companies based in Fuzhou
Chinese brands
Mitsubishi Motors subsidiaries
Joint ventures